Count Károly József Batthyány of Németújvár (28 April 1697, Rohonc – 15 April 1772, Vienna) was a Hungarian general and field marshal. He served as ban (viceroy) of Croatia from 1743 to 1756.

Károly József Batthyány was born in 1697, the son of Hungarian count Adam II. Batthyány and German countess Eleonore Strattmann. He served in the Austrian army under Prince Eugene of Savoy in the war against the Turks, and participated in the battles in Peterwardein, Temeswar and Belgrade.

He commanded in 1734, as a general Imperial troops at the Rhine against France, and in 1737 against the Turks. From 1739 to 1740, he was the envoy at the Berlin Court, but returned, however, after the outbreak of the First Silesian War with Prussia.

In the War of Austrian Succession (1744), he served again as a corps commander. He faced the French under General Ségur in the Battle of Pfaffenhofen on 15 April 1745. In spite of numerical inferiority, he won a huge victory. Batthyány then united forces with Field Marshal Otto Ferdinand von Abensberg und Traun, defeated the French again and forced them back over the Rhine.

In 1746, he served under the command of Charles of Lorraine in Belgium and took part in the Battle of Rocoux, in 1747. Serving under the command of the Duke of Cumberland, he executed an exemplary withdrawal in Lauffeldt.

After the war, Empress Maria Theresa elevated him to the rank of prince (imperial title) on 3 January 1764., he later served as an advisor to the crown prince and later Emperor Joseph II of Austria.

Batthyány was married three times, to Maria Anna Barbara von Waldstein, then to Maria Theresa Countess von Strattmann, and finally to Maria Antonia Nemetujvari Countess Batthyány, daughter of his brother Lajos. He spent his old age in Vienna, where he died in 1772.

References

Sources 
 Wilhelm Edler von Janko: Batthyány, Karl Josef. In: Allgemeine Deutsche Biographie (ADB). Bd. 2, S. 133–134.

External links
List of Bans of Croatia

Field marshals of Austria
Austrian military personnel of the War of the Austrian Succession
Bans of Croatia
1697 births
1772 deaths
Karoly Jozsef
People from Oberwart District
Generals of the Holy Roman Empire
Grand Crosses of the Order of Saint Stephen of Hungary